Mikkel Kessler vs. Andre Ward was a professional boxing match fought as part of the Super Six World Boxing Classic, a tournament staged by Showtime to crown a unified world super middleweight champion. The bout was the final match in the first group stage of the tournament and took place at Oracle Arena in Oakland, California on 21 November 2009.

Mikkel Kessler (43–1, 32 KOs) was making the third defense of the World Boxing Association championship he entered the tournament with. Kessler defeated Dimitri Sartison in June 2008 for the title Joe Calzaghe had defeated him for the previous fall; after defeating Kessler, Calzaghe vacated his super middleweight titles to campaign at light heavyweight.

Andre Ward (20–0, 13 KOs) was fighting in his first world title bout, after a victory against former two-time world title challenger Edison Miranda.

Broadcast 
The fight was broadcast live in the United States on Showtime and in the UK on Primetime.

Result 
Despite Kessler's status as the overall favorite, Ward was able to outpunch the champion and won a unanimous technical decision to win his first world championship. The fight was halted in the eleventh round after Kessler, who suffered cuts due to two controversial headbutts, was ruled unable to continue by the ringside doctor and as per the rules the final score was tabulated at the time of the stoppage. Ward was ahead 98–92, 98–92 and 97–93 at the time of the stoppage. Ward joined Calzaghe as the only fighters at the time to defeat Kessler.

Aftermath 
After the fight, Jim Gray congratulated Ward, who thanked God. Kessler complained to Gray about the holding and hitting and Ward using his head. The referee Jack Reiss apparently said there were five unintentional butts, but Kessler said he thinks they were blatant. Following the victory, Ward was vaulted to the #1 position for Ring Magazine and Kessler fell to 4th.

Fight Card 
The fight card included the following fights:

References

Boxing matches
2009 in boxing
Boxing in California
Sports competitions in Oakland, California
2009 in sports in California
November 2009 sports events in the United States